Langsjøen is a lake in the municipalities of Tolga and Engerdal in Innlandet county, Norway. The  lake lies in the Sømådalen valley in the southeastern part of the municipality, just west of the large lake Femund.

See also
List of lakes in Norway

References

Engerdal
Tolga, Norway
Lakes of Innlandet